YI SOON SHIN is a historical fiction fantasy graphic novel comic book by Onrie Kompan, self-published since 2009. The series is based on the true story of Admiral Yi Soon Shin, a Korean naval commander who saved his people from Japanese invasion forces during the Imjin war in the Joseon Dynasty (1592-1598). Similarly to Frank Miller’s 300, elements of the story are sensationalized.

Publication history
Yi Soon Shin was first released as a 24-page comic book titled Warrior and Defender #1 in December 2009. Over the next two years three additional comic books in the first story arc were released, and subsequently collected in a hardcover graphic novel of the same name in June 2012. The collected graphic novel featured interviews, concept art, and an inspirational foreword written by Stan Lee.

The Fallen Avenger story arc  was released on a semi-regular yearly basis. The creators of Yi Soon Shin have confirmed that they intend to release a hard cover graphic novel for the Fallen Avenger story arc once it is completed. Yi Soon Shin has sold over 70,000 copies in the U.S. and Korea to date and is entirely self-published and self-distributed.

Synopsis
Yi Soon Shin is a graphic novel trilogy broken up into three separate story arcs, each containing four chapters. It is based on the true story of Admiral Yi Soon Shin, a Korean naval commander who saved his people from Japanese invasion forces during the Imjin War (1592-1598). Much like the Nazis during the World War II, the Japanese were known for having little remorse for the innocent civilians of Korea. They raped women, enslaved children and killed elders. All that stood against them was one man who could not be defeated in battle.

External links
The Official Website of the Series

References

2009 graphic novels
2009 comics debuts
Comics set in the 16th century
Comics set in Korea
Comics set in Japan
Fantasy comics
War comics
Cultural depictions of Yi Sun-sin
Japan in non-Japanese culture
Japanese invasions of Korea (1592–1598) in fiction